The Saltukids or Saltuqids (Modern Turkish: Saltuklu Beyliği ) were a dynasty ruling one of the Anatolian beyliks founded after the Battle of Manzikert (1071) and centered on Erzurum. The Saltukids ruled between 1071 and 1202. The beylik was founded by Emir Saltuk, one of the Turkmen commanders of the Great Seljuk Alp Arslan. The beylik fought frequently against the Georgian Kingdom for hegemony of the Kars region. The center of the beylik, Erzurum, was occupied by the Byzantine Empire between 1077 and 1079, and was besieged by the Georgian King Giorgi III in 1184. It comprised the entirety of present-day Erzurum and Bayburt provinces, lands east of Erzincan, most of Kars, and lands north of Ağrı and Muş provinces during its height.

Origin
The first known Saltukid is Ali, who was ruler of Erzurum in 1103. His son and successor was Saltuk, who succeeded him sometime after 1123. Saltuk had a female relative, a daughter or sister, who married Shah-i- Armind of Akhlat, Sukman II.

In 1132, Ali's son Izz al-Din Saltuk became malik. Izz al-Din was defeated captured in 1154 by Georgians, led by Dimitri I. He would be ransomed by Sökmen of the Artuqids, who later married a daughter of Izz al-Din. In 1161, Izz al-Din along with other Turkish allies besieged the Georgians at Ani, but was defeated. He sent a daughter to marry Kilij Arslan II, but she was captured by the Danishmendid Yağıbasan and married off to his nephew.

The Saltukid dynasty is also notable for having a woman, Melike Mama Hatun, sister of Nasiruddin Muhammed, directly administering its realm for an estimated nine years, between 1191 and 1200. She was later dethroned by the Beys and replaced by her son Malik-Shah once she had started searching for a husband among the Mamluk nobility. Mama Hatun built an impressive caravanserai in the town of Tercan, where her mausoleum also stands. Tercan itself used to be called "Mamahatun", and is sometimes still called as such locally.

The name of the ruling dynasty of the beylik should not be confused with that of Sarı Saltuk, a Turkish mystic and saint; who is of later date, more associated with western Anatolia and the Balkans (especially Dobruja), and to whom the epic Saltuknâme is dedicated. The last ruler of the Saltukids, Alaeddin Muhammed, was dethroned and imprisoned by the Sultan of Rum Süleymanshah II during Süleymanshah's Georgian rout in 1202, and the Saltukid beylik was subsequently annexed by the Sultanate of Rum.

Architecture
The beys of Saltuk left important works of architecture such as the Tepsi Minare in Erzurum and the caravanserai in Mama Hatun.

Rulers
 Saltuk I (1071–1102)
 Ali (1102–1124)
 Muzaffer Gazi (1124–1132)
 Izzeddin Saltuk II (1132–1168)
 Nasiruddin Muhammed (1168–1191)
 Melike Mama Hatun (1191–1200)
 Alaeddin Muhammed (1200–1202)

Notes

References
 
 
 (Book cover)

External links

 
 
 
 

Anatolian beyliks
History of Erzurum Province
States and territories established in 1072
Sunni dynasties
Turkic dynasties